Psáře is a municipality and village in Benešov District in the Central Bohemian Region of the Czech Republic. It has about 100 inhabitants.

Administrative parts
The village of Dubovka is an administrative part of Psáře.

References

Villages in Benešov District